Eridotrypa is an extinct genus of bryozoans of the family Aisenvergiidae, consistently forming colonies made of thin branches (only about 1 to 2.25 millimeters wide).  Diaphragms are very common in colonies. Distinctively, in the exozone there are serrated dark borders separating the autozooecia.

References

Stenolaemata
Animals described in 1893
Fossils of Estonia
Prehistoric bryozoan genera